Jo Ellen Bogart (born October 20, 1945) is a US and Canadian writer of children's books living in Guelph, Ontario.

The daughter of a telephone company manager, the oldest of four children, she was born in Houston and grew up there, in San Antonio and in Dallas. Bogart received degrees in education and psychology from the University of Texas at Austin. She came to Canada in 1975, becoming a Canadian citizen in 1995 but retaining her US citizenship.

She married Jim Bogart, who was born in Toronto but was studying in Texas. The couple spent four years in Louisiana before her husband took a position at the University of Guelph. She worked as a substitute teacher for several years.

Many of her books have been included on the Canadian Children's Book Centre's Our Choice lists.

Bogart provided the lyrics for six songs on the Eddie Douglas recording for children Gonna Keep Dancing, which was nominated for a Juno Award.

Selected works 
 Malcolm's Runaway Soap (1988) illustrated by Linda Hendry
 Dylan’s Lullaby (1988) illustrated by Cheryl Lowrey
 Daniel's Dog (1990) illustrated by Janet Wilson
 Gifts (1994) illustrated by Barbara Reid
 Jeremiah Learns to Read (1997) illustrated by Laura Fernandez and Rick Jacobson, received the Ruth and Sylvia Schwartz Children's Book Award and a Tiny Torgi Print Braille Book Award
 Dogs and Dog Care (1999) Coles Notes series
 Capturing Joy, the Story of Maud Lewis (2002) illustrated by Mark Lang
 Emily Carr: At the Edge of the World (2004) illustrated by Maxwell Newhouse, named the Children’s Literature Roundtables of Canada Information Book Award Honour Book
 Big and Small, Room for All (2009), finalist for a Lane Anderson Award in the category Science for Young Readers
 The White Cat and the Monk (2016) illustrated by Sydney Smith, based on an Old Irish poem "Pangur Bán", finalist for a Governor General's Award

References 

1945 births
Living people
Canadian women children's writers
American women children's writers
American children's writers
University of Texas at Austin College of Education alumni
21st-century American women